Chris Feather (born ) is an English former professional rugby league footballer. He plays for  Wyong Roos in the Tooheys Cup in Newcastle. He previously played for  Villeneuve Leopards in the Elite One Championship, and  Castleford Tigers (Heritage № 897) and  Bradford Bulls in the Super League. He has also played for  Wakefield Trinity Wildcats,  Leeds Rhinos, and  Castleford Tigers.

Background
Feather was born in Keighley, West Yorkshire, England.

Rugby career
Chris came through the ranks at Wakefield Trinity Wildcats, and he made his début in the 2001. He made just 5 substitute appearances in 2001, but in 2002 made 13 starts and 18 at substitute, including an appearance in the Challenge Cup quarter final at Headingley when he scored against the Leeds Rhinos. He was also one of Wakefield’s top performers.

2004-2009
In 2004 he re-joined Wakefield Trinity Wildcats on loan for the last two months of the season. He made 8 appearances for Wakefield Trinity Wildcats and was one of their top performers in the play-off success, scoring a try against Hull. He returned to Wakefield Trinity Wildcats again in 2005 on loan, making 21 appearances and scoring 1-try in the Wakefield Trinity Wildcats victory over Salford City Reds before returning to Leeds Rhinos at the end of the Wakefield Trinity Wildcats' season.

Feather joined Leeds Rhinos for the 2003's Super League VIII on a four-year contract. In his first season at Headingley he was a regular member of the first team however he did not start a game all season, instead making an impact off the bench on 28 occasions. His first try for Rhinos came against Halifax when Leeds won 20-14 at The Shay. Feather was part of the squad that reached the Challenge Cup at Cardiff however he had the heartache of missing out on selection for the big day. Feather went back on loan to Wakefield Trinity Wildcats at the end of 2004 and the whole of 2005 and returned to Leeds for 2006 and played 12 games.

Bradford Bulls
Feather signed for Bradford Bulls in August 2006. His contract was for the 2007, 2008, 2009 seasons. Feather broke his ankle in May 2007 and was ruled out for a couple of months. He also suffered two shoulder dislocations, injuries to his back and a neck injury that caused temporarily paralysis in April 2008. At the end of 2008, he was released from his contract by mutual consent, and joined Castleford Tigers on a one-year deal, joining fellow ex-Bradford Bulls player James Evans.

Castleford Tigers
He signed for Castleford Tigers in October 2008. Chris started strong and made a good start for Cas. His performances tailed off towards the end of the season and it is strongly rumoured he will be on his way out of The Jungle for 2010.

Statistics

Club career

Off the Field
Chris Feather is studying a sports science degree at Leeds Metropolitan University.

Australia 
Chris Feather signed on to play with the Wyong Roos in Newcastle during June 2010.

References

External links
(archived by web.archive.org) Chris Feather Player Profile
 Chris Feather MySpace
 Bradford sign Chris Feather
 Axe falls on injury-jinxed Feather
(archived by web.archive.org) Profile at leedsrugby

1981 births
Living people
Alumni of Leeds Beckett University
Bradford Bulls players
Castleford Tigers players
English rugby league players
Leeds Rhinos players
Rugby league players from Keighley
Rugby league props
Villeneuve Leopards players
Wakefield Trinity players
Wyong Roos players